Thomas (the Tank Engine) & Friends is a children's television series about the engines and other characters working on the railways of the Island of Sodor, and is based on The Railway Series books written by the Reverend W. Awdry.

This article lists and details episodes from the sixth series of the show, which was first broadcast in 2002.

This series was narrated by Michael Angelis for the UK audiences, who also re-dubbed two episodes for US audiences, while Alec Baldwin narrated all of the episodes for the US audiences, in what was also his last series. Six episodes were later re-dubbed for US audiences by Michael Brandon.

In the United States, this was the second season of the series that was not aired on PBS Kids. Prior to its release, the series was released on VHS & DVD.

Most episodes in this series have one title; the American titles are shown underneath the United Kingdom titles.

Production

Phil Fehrle had taken over as producer from David Mitton and Britt Allcroft, while Angus Wright had been replaced by Allcroft and Peter Urie as executive producers.

This was the first series to oversee an introduction of a writing staff, since the stories from The Railway Series had already been adapted. Staff-written stories had been introduced in Series 5, and this practice remained unchanged. The series was filmed between September 2001 and March 2002, and premiered on September 16, 2002.

Abi Grant served as script editor for the series. 

Steve Asquith, who would later become the all-out director of Thomas & Friends, directed two season 6 episodes in place of David Mitton. However, David still directed the other 24 episodes and went on until season 7. After that, Steve Asquith took over for good.

Episodes

Characters

Introduced
 Salty ("Salty's Secret")
 Harvey ("Harvey to the Rescue")
 Elizabeth ("Elizabeth the Vintage Lorry")
 Jack ("Jack Jumps In")
 Alfie ("Jack Jumps In")
 Oliver the Excavator ("Jack Jumps In")
 Max ("Jack Jumps In")
 Kelly ("Jack Jumps In")
 Byron ("Jack Jumps In")
 Ned ("A Friend in Need")
 Isobella ("Jack Jumps In")
 Cyril ("The Fogman")
 Jenny Packard ("Jack Jumps In")
 The Foreman ("Jack Jumps In")
 Allicia Botti ("Thomas, Percy and the Squeak")
 Farmer McColl ("Toby Had a Little Lamb") (not named in original versions)

Recurring cast

 Thomas
 Edward
 Henry
 Gordon
 James
 Percy
 Toby
 Duck
 Donald and Douglas
 Bill and Ben
 Diesel
 Mavis
 'Arry and Bert
 Skarloey
 Rheneas
 Peter Sam
 Rusty
 Duncan
 Troublesome Trucks
 Bertie
 Trevor
 Harold
 Cranky
 The Fat Controller
 Stephen Hatt
 Stepney (does not speak)
 Annie and Clarabel (do not speak)
 Henrietta (does not speak)
 Terence (does not speak)
 Jem Cole (does not speak)
 Oliver (cameo)
 George (cameo)
 Butch (cameo)
 Tiger Moth (cameo)
 Bridget Hatt (cameo)
 Mrs. Kyndley (cameo)
 Farmer Trotter (cameo)
 The Refreshment Lady (cameo)
 Nancy (cameo)
 Tom Tipper (cameo)
 Dowager Hatt (cameo)
 Bulgy (mentioned)

Home Video Releases
Series 6 was released on VHS and DVD in the UK by Video Collection International in three volumes. They were released in their original widescreen ratio on DVD, however, "The Chocolate Crunch" was released in fullscreen on both formats.

The only two episodes not released in these volumes are "It's Only Snow" and "Jack Frost", the former of which was included in the Series 7 release "Engines to the Rescue". The entirety of Series 6 was released on DVD in June 2007, and various episodes from the series have also appeared on other DVD releases.

Notes

References

2002 British television seasons
Thomas & Friends seasons